The Critical Access Hospital program is a United States federal program established in 1997 as part of the Balanced Budget Act. The program aims to offer small hospitals in rural areas to serve residents that would otherwise be a long distance from emergency care.

As of January 2018, there are 1,343 certified Critical Access Hospitals in 45 states. Connecticut, Delaware, Maryland, New Jersey and Rhode Island do not have any CAHs.

Requirements
To receive federal funding, Critical Access Hospitals must adhere to several guidelines. They may have no more than 25 beds and must have an average duration of hospital stay under 96 hours. They must also be more than 35 miles from another hospital, with exceptions allowed for areas with poor roads or difficult terrain.

CAHs have more flexibility than other hospitals in staffing requirements. They must offer 24/7 emergency care and have a physician on-call available to be on-site within 60 minutes. They are required to have a Registered Nurse on site at all times when acutely ill patients are in the hospital. At other times, a Licensed Practical Nurse (LPN) may fill in.

In most cases, a Doctor of Medicine or Doctor of Osteopathic Medicine, a physician assistant, a nurse practitioner, or a clinical nurse specialist (defined as a nurse with at least a master's degree in nursing) must be available for immediate contact by phone or radio. The provider must be able to be on-site within 30 minutes unless it is an area designated by the census as a "frontier area" or if the state has determined that it is not possible for the hospital to keep staff available within 30 minutes, and a registered nurse is available on-site. In CAHs with 10 or fewer beds, a registered nurse with training in emergency care is allowed to fulfill the role of the on-call physician.

Critical access hospitals must have all the equipment and medications required for essential medical treatment, and have agreements in place with larger hospitals for the transport of patients in need of further care.

Pharmaceutical companies are legally required to pay for a portion of the medications used by critical access hospitals as part of the 340B Drug Pricing Program.

Few CAHs provide intensive care treatment. A review of CAHs in the early 2000s counted 26% of the hospitals providing intensive care-level treatment to at least one patient. About two-thirds of these hospitals had a physical intensive care unit, while the remainder provided intensive care treatment in areas of the hospital also treating acute care patients. The mean number of intensive care beds in each hospital was 3.5. Two-thirds of the hospitals providing intensive care treatment staffed these areas with registered nurses only. Most of the hospitals providing intensive care services also provided surgical services.

Key legislation 
The program was created with the Balanced Budget Act of 1997, and modified with the Balanced Budget Refinement Act of 1999.
The Medicare Prescription Drug, Improvement, and Modernization Act of 2003 increased reimbursement for CAHs to 101% of care costs. The Medicare Improvements to the Patients and Providers Act of 2008 expanded grants available to CAHs and further incentivized reimbursement.

References

United States federal health legislation
1997 establishments in the United States
Hospitals in the United States